Chah Hajji (also Romanized as Chāh Ḩājjī) is a village in Howmeh Rural District, in the Central District of Kahnuj County, Kerman Province, Iran. At the 2006 census, its population was 667, in 155 families.

References 

Populated places in Kahnuj County